Chak 285 JB (Jhang Branch) and Chak 284 JB  are villages of Toba Tek Singh District in the Punjab province of Pakistan.  Their postal code is 36101.

They are located at 31°03′52″N 72°37′52″E with an altitude of 162 metres (534 feet). 
Neighbouring settlements include Randian and Bilasur. It is located at Gojra - Toba Tek Singh Road.

References 

Union councils of Toba Tek Singh District